"Weddings and Funerals" is a nursery rhyme or folksong and playground game.

A wedding song we played for you,
The dance you did but scorn.
A woeful dirge we chanted, too,
But then you would not mourn.

Origin

The exact words of this English nursery rhyme were incorporated as the translation of these verses in the International Standard Version (2008).

In context, the verse was spoken by Jesus as a reproach to those people who rejected both the austere lifestyle and preaching of John the Baptist and his own more accessible ministry.

References

Songs about marriage
Songs about death
English nursery rhymes
English children's songs
English folk songs
Traditional children's songs
Cultural depictions of John the Baptist
New Testament words and phrases
Sayings of Jesus
Gospel of Matthew
Year of song unknown
Matthew 11
Songwriter unknown